Kirihara Station is the name of two train stations in Japan:

 Kirihara Station (Nagano)
 Kirihara Station (Niigata)